Poonakary,is a tamil village strategically important village in the northern province of Sri Lanka situated just below the Jaffna Peninsula. 

A fort was built in the Poonakary area of northern portion of the island, at first by the Portuguese to protect its possessions in Jaffna. It was later taken and expanded by the Dutch, and in 1770 it was recorded that it was square-shaped with two bastions at opposite corners; the rampart on each of the sides was about 30 metres, it was garrisoned until the late 18th century. The British built a rest house in 1805. 

Since 1983, due to the civil war, it was garrisoned by the Sri Lankan Army from 1983 until the Sri Lankan military withdrew from the Poonakary area in 1991. See also e.g. Battle_of_Pooneryn. The fort was recaptured from LTTE (liberation tigers of tamil eelam) in 2009. Ruins of the fort remains, though in bad condition.

References

Towns in Kilinochchi District
Poonakary DS Division